Elmo McClain (August 4, 1917 – June 15, 1972) was an American educator and politician.

McClain graduated from Quincy University and from Western Illinois University. He served in the United States Army during World War II. McClain lived with his wife and family in Quincy, Illinois. McClain served in the Illinois House of Representatives from 1965 until his death in 1972. McClain was a Democrat. McClain died at St. John's Hospital in Springfield, Illinois after suffering a heart attack while on the floor of the Illinois House of Representatives at the state capitol.

Notes

1917 births
1972 deaths
People from Quincy, Illinois
Military personnel from Illinois
Quincy University alumni
Western Illinois University alumni
Schoolteachers from Illinois
Democratic Party members of the Illinois House of Representatives
20th-century American politicians
United States Army personnel of World War II